Nicholas Kanabos was elected Byzantine emperor during the Fourth Crusade on 27 January 1204 by an assembly of the Byzantine Senate, priests, and the mob of Constantinople in direct opposition to co-emperors Isaac II and Alexios IV. Nicholas was a young noble who was chosen after three days of sorting through several unwilling candidates and refused to assume the lofty position. Though popularly chosen, he never accepted imperial power, and took sanctuary in the bowels of Hagia Sophia. Alexios V Doukas, who had deposed Emperors Isaac II and Alexios IV, offered Nicholas a prominent position in his own administration. Nicholas's supporters initially denounced the attempt to remove him from imperial power; however, as Alexios V grew more popular, Nicholas's support began to collapse. Early in February, Alexios V arrested and imprisoned Nicholas and his wife without significant resistance. Nicholas was ultimately executed.

The contemporary historian Niketas Choniates described Nicholas Kanabos as a man "gentle by nature, of keen intelligence, and versed in generalship and war". According to the Novgorod Chronicle, he "reigned" for six days and six nights."

References

Sources
 
 (Novgorod Chronicle)
Cheynet, Jean-Claude (1990). Pouvoir et contestations à Byzance (963–1210). p. 142.

12th-century births
1204 deaths
13th-century Byzantine emperors
13th-century murdered monarchs
Byzantine usurpers
Christians of the Fourth Crusade
Deaths by strangulation